Dog is a stop motion animated short film written, directed and animated by Suzie Templeton. The film was made at the Royal College of Art in 2001.

Premise 
A young boy and his father live in a dull, lonely house with the shadow of mourning hanging over them both. The boy misses his mother and longs for reassurance about how his mother died but gets no comfort from his father’s ascertains that she went peacefully. To protect each other, he and his father hold their agony inside, where it festers. This tragedy is added to by the family dog which is looking increasingly unhealthy.

Awards 
McLaren Award for New British Animation: 2001 Edinburgh International Film Festival, Scotland
National Film Board of Canada Grand Prize (Student Competition Year): 2001 Ottawa International Animation Festival, Canada
Cinewomen Award for Best Female Director: 2001 FAN International Short Film and Animation Festival, UK
Best Animation: 2001 Royal Television Society London Centre Student Television Awards, UK
BAFTA - Short Animation Film: 2002 British Academy of Film and Television Arts, UK
Paul Berry Award for Best Student Film: 2002 British Animation Awards, UK
Best Experimental Animation: 2002 California SUN International Animation Festival, USA
Best Animation: 2002 Royal Television Society National Student Television Awards, UK
Best Animation: 2002 Brooklyn International Film Festival, USA  
Grand Prix: 2002 Dervio International Cartoons and Comics Festival, Italy
Best Overall Film: 2002 Melbourne International Animation Festival, Australia
Best Student Animation: 2002 Palm Springs International Festival of Short Films, USA
Special Mention: 2002 Regensburg Short Film Week, Germany
Bronze Award: 2002 WorldFest-Houston International Film Festival, USA
Hiroshima Prize: 2002 Hiroshima International Animation Festival, Japan
Winner of Professional Category: 2002 D&AD/Campaign Screen New Directors Competition, England
Anyzone Award: 2002 Holland Animation Film Festival, The Netherlands
Grand Prix - Narrative Film: 2002 Holland Animation Film Festival, The Netherlands
Grand Prix: 2002 Siena International Short Film Festival, Italy
Best Story: 2002 Black Nights Film Festival, Tallinn, Estonia
Best Animation: 2003 Tampere Film Festival, Finland

External links

2000s animated short films
BAFTA winners (films)
2001 films
Stop-motion animated short films
British animated short films
2000s English-language films
2000s British films